To Build a Fire (French: Construire un Feu) is a 2016 French animated short film directed by Fx Goby adapted from the 1902 and 1908 short story "To Build a Fire" by Jack London. The film has been presented in a number of festivals including the Cannes Film Festival, the Anibar International Animation Festival, the New Orleans Film Festival and the Rhode Island International Film Festival where it won the prize for best animation.

The film was partially funded through Indiegogo, an  American crowdfunding platform.

Premise
In the harshness of midwinter, an unnamed man attempts to travel across ten miles of Yukon wilderness to arrive at a camp where his friends are while bracing temperatures dropping to seventy-five degrees below zero with his companion, a wolf-dog. Struggling to survive, he makes multiple attempts to build a simple fire.

Awards
"Animation Grand Prize", Rhode Island International Film Festival 2016
"Best International Animation", Shorts Mexico 2016
"Special Accolade", Animaze Montreal Animation Film Festival 2016
"Best Original Score", Fimucine Canary Island film festival 2016
The short was also included in The animation Showcase Best of the year 2016.

References

External links
 
 

2016 animated films
2016 films
2010s French animated films
French animated short films
Films based on works by Jack London
2010s English-language films